The Saints Philip and James Church is a Roman Catholic church in Mrkonjić Grad, Bosnia and Herzegovina.

References 

Mrkonjic Grad
Mrkonjić Grad
Roman Catholic churches completed in 1889
Buildings and structures in Republika Srpska
19th-century Roman Catholic church buildings in Bosnia and Herzegovina